Zaratha mesonyctia is a moth of the family Agonoxenidae. It is found in Bolivia.

References

Moths described in 1909
Zaratha
Moths of South America